DOTGA: Da One That Ghost Away (stylized as Da One That Ghost Away) is a 2018 Filipino horror comedy film directed by Tony Y. Reyes and starring Ryan Bang, Kim Chiu, Enzo Pineda and the duo of Maymay Entrata and Edward Barber in their second film after Loving in Tandem (2017). It was released by Star Cinema on April 18, 2018, in cinemas.

Cast

Ryan Bang as Jerald "Jeje" Zee-Yan
Kim Chiu as Carmel Monseratt
Enzo Pineda as Jack Colmenares
Maymay Entrata as Serrah Monseratt
Edward Barber as Chire
Pepe Herrera as Bagang
Lassy Marquez as Ponzi
Moi Marcampo as Basha
Tetay as Krissy
Chokoleit† as Chicken Feet
Matet de Leon as Halak
Cai Cortez as Taba ko
Marissa Delgado as Lola Coquita
Odette Khan as Lola Canturzia
Melai Cantiveros as Anabelle
Loisa Andalio as Young Canturzia
Sofia Andres as Young Coquita

See also
 List of ghost films

References

External links

Philippine comedy horror films
Star Cinema films
2018 films
2018 comedy horror films
Films directed by Tony Y. Reyes